Father for a Night (Italian: Papà per una notte) is a 1939 Italian "white-telephones" romantic comedy film directed by Mario Bonnard and starring Sergio Tofano, Clelia Matania, and Carlo Romano.

It was shot at the Scalera Studios in Rome. The film's sets were designed by the art director Gustav Abel.

Cast
Sergio Tofano as Edmondo Fontages
Clelia Matania as Luisa
Carlo Romano as Agostino
Leonardo Cortese as Jacques Fontages
Gemma Bolognesi as Henriette Fontages
Ugo Ceseri as Pietro Gambier
Rosetta Tofano as Marietta
Barbara Nardi as Lulù
Jone Romano as Zia Paolina
Giuseppe Luigi Mariani as L'ispettore del fisco
Aleardo Ward as Il cameriere
Carola Lotti as La cameriera
Aristide Garbini as L'autista
Titì as a baby

References

External links

1930s Italian-language films
Films directed by Mario Bonnard
1939 romantic comedy films
Italian romantic comedy films
Films shot at Scalera Studios
Italian black-and-white films
1930s Italian films